Dow Jones & Co. Inc. v Gutnick was an Internet defamation case heard in the High Court of Australia, decided on 10 December 2002.  The 28 October 2000 edition of Barron's Online, published by Dow Jones, contained an article entitled "Unholy Gains" in which several references were made to the respondent, Joseph Gutnick.  Gutnick contended that part of the article defamed him. A key judgement was that the suit could be brought in Australia.

Facts 

The article in question was entitled Unholy Gains, by William Alpert, published in Barron's 2000 Oct 30. Australian courts described the details of the article in their written opinion on the case, as follows:

"[The article] "states that some of his business dealings with religious charities raise "uncomfortable questions" . . . . The author then uses some language that the media have appropriated from the law courts, implying that a balanced trial with equal opportunity to participate by all concerned has taken place: that a "Barron's investigation found that several charities traded heavily in stocks promoted by Gutnick." . . .  (emphasis added) The article associates the respondent with Mr Nachum Goldberg who is apparently a convicted tax evader and another person awaiting trial for [[stock manipulation]] in New York."

In court it was proven that only five copies of the Barron's print edition were sent from New Jersey to be circulated in Australia, but that none had actually arrived in the Jurisdiction. Gutnick therefore resorted to the internet based publication in order to show an actionable tort in the jurisdiction. The Internet version of the magazine had 550,000 international subscribers and 1700 Australian-based credit cards.

Geoffrey Robertson QC argued for the publisher Dow Jones as to whether it was considered to be "published from" where it was uploaded in New Jersey or "published into" where it was downloaded by subscribers in Victoria, Australia. The argument was on publication and jurisdiction.

Decision

In a unanimous decision, all seven High Court justices decided that Gutnick had the right to sue for defamation at his primary residence and the place he was best known. Victoria was considered the place where damage to his reputation occurred. The High Court decided that defamation did not occur at the time of publishing, but as soon as a third party read the publication and thought less of the individual who was defamed.

Dow Jones was forced to admit in court that "there was no reason to believe Mr Gutnick was a customer of Mr Goldberg or had any criminal or improper relations with Mr Goldberg." (quote from an Australian Broadcasting Corporation story)

The High Court's ruling effectively allows defamation plaintiffs in Australia to sue for defamation on the internet against any defendant irrespective of their location.  "If people wish to do business in, or indeed travel to, or live in, or utilize the infrastructure of different countries, they can hardly expect to be absolved from compliance with the laws of those countries.  The fact that publication might occur everywhere does not mean that it occurs nowhere." (per Callinan J at para 186)

Equally, however, the majority of the Court (Gleeson CJ, McHugh, Gummow and Hayne JJ handing down a joint decision) stated that they disagreed that this would cause open-slather defamation actions in Australia: (at para 54 of the decision)

The case was highly controversial and the subject of much commentary from legal analysts.
The case was appealed by the author, to the UN under the right of direct petition for individuals. In the teeth of that application prepared by Geoffrey Robertson, Tim Robertson SC, Mark Stephens (solicitor) and Sydney based lawyer Paul Reidy, the case was settled on 15 November 2004, Dow Jones settled the case, agreeing to pay Gutnick some of his legal fees.

External links

Press release — High Court of Australia (1 page)
Jurisdiction and the Internet after Gutnick and Yahoo!
Reaction to the judgment from Barrons

References

Computer case law
Australian defamation case law
High Court of Australia cases
2002 in Australian law
2002 in case law
Dow Jones & Company